Pseudoplanodes xenoceroides is a species of beetle in the family Cerambycidae. It is known from Heller in 1923. It is known from the Philippines. It contains the varietas Pseudoplanodes xenoceroides var. helleri.

References

Mesosini
Beetles described in 1923